The Frères chasseurs (French for "Hunter Brothers") were a paramilitary organization that fought in the Patriote Rebellion on the Patriote side, seeking to make Lower Canada, now Quebec, an independent and democratic republic.

After the failure of the first uprising of 1837, the Frères chasseurs organization was founded in 1838 by Robert Nelson, Cyrille-Hector-Octave Côté (the vice president), Edmond-Élisée Malhiot, Antoine Doré, Julien Gagnon, Louis-Guillaume Lévesque, François Mercure, François Lemaître, Célestin Beausoleil and David Rochon. In September, it was composed of at least 35 lodges.

The Frères chasseurs attempted to invade Lower Canada from the United States to defeat the British army and its volunteers. On 22 February 1838, president Robert Nelson declared the independence of Lower Canada. Bishop Jean-Jacques Lartigue obtained information about the group and communicated it to John Colborne, who in turn used it to quell the Frères chasseurs. Members of the Frères chasseurs such as François-Marie-Thomas Chevalier de Lorimier were executed at the Pied-du-Courant Prison by the British authorities for their actions.

See also 
Republicanism in Canada
Hunters' Lodges
Executions at the Pied-du-Courant Prison
Quebec nationalism
Quebec independence movement
History of Quebec
Timeline of Quebec history

Canada–United States relations
Lower Canada Rebellion
Paramilitary organizations based in Canada